Tina Costa (11 November 1925 – 20 March 2019) was an Italian anti-fascist and syndicalist.

Biography 
Born in Gemmano near Rimini from an anti-fascist family, Costa refused to wear the compulsory fascist school uniform.

During Second World War 
During Second World War, Tina Costa entered the Resistance and joined the Italian Communist Party since Second Italo-Ethiopian War; she performed several jobs as a dispatch rider through the Gothic Line.

She was arrested with her mother and one of her brothers and was imprisoned in Fossoli camp but they all escaped during a bombing that hit their train.

Activism 
After the war Costa stayed in the Italian Communist Party till its closure and then joined the Communist Refoundation Party. Costa was an active member of Italian General Confederation of Labour and board member of dell'National Association of Italian Partisans- She took part in rallies for civil and political rights till her death.

Death 
Tina Costa died in Rome on 20 March 2019 at 93 years Several politicians mourned her death.

References

1925 births
2019 deaths
Italian resistance movement
Italian anti-fascists
Communist Refoundation Party politicians
Italian Communist Party politicians
20th-century Italian women politicians
Italian syndicalists